The 1983 Chosonminhang Il-62 crash occurred on 1 July 1983 when an Ilyushin Il-62M being operated by the flag carrier airline of North Korea, Chosonminhang, crashed into mountainous terrain in the West African country of Guinea. All 23 people aboard were killed. The aircraft was flying from Pyongyang with construction cargo and numerous workers ahead of the 1984 Organization of African Unity summit due to take place the following year. It remains the deadliest aviation crash in Guinean history, and was the tenth operational loss of an Il-62 since its introduction.

Aircraft and flight
P-889 was a Soviet-made Ilyushin Il-62M manufactured by the Kazan Aviation Plant in early 1981. It was sold to North Korea's national airline, Chosonminhang (now called Air Koryo), the same year. With the exception of an aborted takeoff in 1982 due to an inadvertently opened cargo hatch, the aircraft had no incident history.

On 1 July 1983, P-889 was carrying construction material, as well as several construction workers and technicians, from Pyongyang, North Korea to complete work on a hall ahead of the twentieth Organization of African Unity summit scheduled to take place in Conakry, Guinea, in May 1984. P-889 made two intermediate stops on the way to Guinea, stopping in Kabul and Cairo to refuel.

Accident and aftermath
On 1 July 1983, P-889 crashed in the Guinean highland region of Fouta Djallon, near the town of Labé, 160 miles northwest of Conakry International Airport. All 23 aboard were killed. It was the airline's first fatal accident. News of the crash was slow to spread due to difficulties in reaching the remote crash site. Although the cause of the crash was never publicly released, pilot error compounded by fatigue is suspected.

A high-level delegation of Guinean government officials traveled to North Korea shortly after the crash to deliver official condolences to Kim Il Sung.

See also

 Eastern Air Lines Flight 980
 Aeroflot Flight 498
 Aeroflot Flight 5463
 Thai Airways International Flight 311

References 

1983 in Guinea
Aviation accidents and incidents in Guinea
Aviation accidents and incidents in 1983
Accidents and incidents involving the Ilyushin Il-62
July 1983 events in Asia
Airliner accidents and incidents involving controlled flight into terrain
Labé Region